UMSU may stand for:

University of Manchester Students' Union
University of Manitoba Students' Union
University of Melbourne Student Union
Universitas Muhammadiyah Sumatera Utara, a university in Indonesia